Australian mythology stems largely from Europeans who colonised the country from 1788, subsequent domestic innovation, as well as other immigrant and Indigenous Australian traditions, many of which relate to Dreamtime stories.  Australian mythology survives through a combination of word of mouth, historical accounts and the continued practice and belief in Dreamtime within Aboriginal communities.

Dreamtime

The beginnings of Australian mythology center on the Aboriginal belief system known as Dreamtime, which dates back as far as 65,000 years.  Aboriginals believed Earth was created by spiritual beings who physically represented the land, sea, animals and people. 'Everything in the natural world is a symbolic footprint of the metaphysical beings whose actions created our world." Through practices such as storytelling, dance and art, Dreamtime provided the foundation for Aboriginal culture and spirituality.

Colonial myths and folklore
Since European settlement, Australian mythology shifted away from Dreamtime and focused more on the ideals of the average Australian worker.  A strong central theme was rebellion, with stories of common heroes who "laugh in the face of adversity, face up to great difficulties and deliberately go against authority and the establishment".

These figures were further romanticised during the Australian gold rushes, lovingly dubbed The Diggers by the public; who wrote songs, poetry and generally idealised them and their lives.  This proved influential on a more mainstream level with soldiers serving in World War I also dubbed The Diggers, a name that still stands today.

Bunyip
Bunyip is a large mythical creature from Aboriginal mythology which is said to lurk in swamps or billabongs and eat people from the shoreline.  While descriptions vary, the creature is said to be a reptilian marsupial hybrid, with sizes comparable to "a large dog", and displays of violent, territorial behavior.  Mythology consistently names swamps and rivers as the preferred home of the Bunyip, stating that settlement over the years disrupted the creature, causing it to attack locals.  Witnesses would claim the creature often "preferred" to attack women and children.

Drop Bear
Drop Bear is a mythical Australian marsupial from Australian mythology which stemmed from Europeans. Drop Bears are said to be large, carnivorous koalas that inhabit tree tops and attack their prey by dropping on their heads from above.  The myth is often considered humorous by Australians, who simply exaggerate the behavioral traits of koalas which are typically passive creatures.

Yowie

Yowie is a mythical/cryptid hominid purported to live in the Australian wilderness. The creature stems from both European/Aboriginal mythology.  Described as "long, narrow" humanlike creatures, the Yowies were said to be territorial and primitive in nature.  In some cases, the Yowies were cannibals, hunting and feasting on human victims caught in their elaborate traps.  The legend garnered mainstream public attention in the 1990s, when confectionery company Cadbury created chocolates associated with the mythology. Six characters were created, all human-marsupial hybrids.  Related merchandising, such as magazines, centered on endangered species and caring for the environment.

See also

 Australian Aboriginal mythology
 Australian folklore
 Culture of Australia
 Dreamtime

References

External links

Australian mythology